Oklahoma is an unincorporated community in Carroll County, Mississippi, United States.

History
The community's name may be a direct transfer from the state of Oklahoma. Oklahoma is a name ultimately derived from the Choctaw language meaning "red people".

References

Unincorporated communities in Mississippi
Unincorporated communities in Carroll County, Mississippi
Mississippi placenames of Native American origin